José Juan Cotto (born February 18, 1977 in Caguas, Puerto Rico) is a retired Puerto Rican professional boxer. As an amateur, Cotto represented Puerto Rico in the flyweight division (– 51 kg), winning a bronze medal at the 1995 Pan American Games in Mar del Plata, Argentina. Cotto made his professional debut on 14 December 1997, defeating compatriot Elias Cepeda in Fajardo, Puerto Rico.

External links 
 

1977 births
Living people
Flyweight boxers
People from Caguas, Puerto Rico
Puerto Rican male boxers
Boxers at the 1995 Pan American Games
Pan American Games bronze medalists for Puerto Rico
Pan American Games medalists in boxing
Medalists at the 1995 Pan American Games